In experimental particle physics, pseudorapidity, is a commonly used spatial coordinate describing the angle of a particle relative to the beam axis.  It is defined as

where  is the angle between the particle three-momentum  and the positive direction of the beam axis. Inversely,

As a function of three-momentum , pseudorapidity can be written as

where  is the component of the momentum along the beam axis (i.e. the longitudinal momentum – using the conventional system of coordinates for hadron collider physics, this is also commonly denoted ).  In the limit where the particle is travelling close to the speed of light, or equivalently in the approximation that the mass of the particle is negligible, one can make the substitution  (i.e. in this limit, the particle's only energy is its momentum-energy, similar to the case of the photon), and hence the pseudorapidity converges to the definition of rapidity used in experimental particle physics: 

However, pseudorapidity depends only on the polar angle of the particle's trajectory, and not on the energy of the particle. One speaks of the "forward" direction in a hadron collider experiment, which refers to regions of the detector that are close to the beam axis, at high ; in contexts where the distinction between "forward" and "backward" is relevant, the former refers to the positive z-direction and the latter to the negative z-direction.

In hadron collider physics, the rapidity (or pseudorapidity) is preferred over the polar angle  because, loosely speaking, particle production is constant as a function of rapidity, and because differences in rapidity are Lorentz invariant under boosts along the longitudinal axis: they transform additively, similar to velocities in Galilean relativity. A measurement of a rapidity difference  between particles (or  if the particles involved are massless) is hence not dependent on the longitudinal boost of the reference frame (such as the laboratory frame). This is an important feature for hadron collider physics, where the colliding partons carry different longitudinal momentum fractions x, which means that the rest frames of the parton-parton collisions will have different longitudinal boosts.

The rapidity as a function of pseudorapidity is given by

where  is the transverse momentum (i.e. the component of the three-momentum perpendicular to the beam axis).

Using a second-order Maclaurin expansion of  expressed in  one can approximate rapidity by

Rapidity is used to define a measure of angular separation between particles commonly used in particle physics , which is Lorentz invariant under a boost along the longitudinal (beam) direction. Often, the rapidity term in this expression is replaced by pseudorapidity, yielding a definition with purely angular quantities: , which is Lorentz invariant if the involved particles are massless. The difference in azimuthal angle, is invariant under Lorentz boosts along the beam line (z-axis) because it is measured in a plane (i.e. the "transverse" x-y plane) orthogonal to the beam line.

Values 

Here are some representative values:
{| class=wikitable
! 
! 
! 
! 
|-
| 0°
| ∞
| 180°
| −∞
|-
| 0.1°
| 7.04
| 179.9°
| −7.04
|-
| 0.5°
| 5.43
| 179.5°
| −5.43
|-
| 1°
| 4.74
| 179°
| −4.74
|-
| 2°
| 4.05
| 178°
| −4.05
|-
| 5°
| 3.13
| 175°
| −3.13
|- 
| 10°
| 2.44
| 170°
| −2.44
|-
| 20°
| 1.74
| 160°
| −1.74
|-
| 30°
| 1.32
| 150°
| −1.32
|- 
| 45°
| 0.88
| 135°
| −0.88
|-
| 60°
| 0.55
| 120°
| −0.55
|-
| 80°
| 0.175
| 100°
| −0.175
|-
| 90°
| 0
|colspan=2|
|}

In other words, .

Conversion to Cartesian momenta

Hadron colliders measure physical momenta in terms of transverse momentum , polar angle in the transverse plane  and pseudorapidity .  To obtain cartesian momenta  (with the -axis defined as the beam axis), the following conversions are used:

,
which gives .
Note that  is the longitudinal momentum component, which is denoted  in the text above ( is the standard notation at hadron colliders).

The equivalent relations to get the full four-momentum (in natural units) using "true" rapidity  are:

,
where  is the transverse mass. 

A boost of velocity  along the beam-axis of velocity corresponds to an additive change in rapidity of  using the relation .
Under such a Lorentz transformation, the rapidity of a particle will become  and the four-momentum becomes 

.

This sort of transformation is common in hadron colliders. For example, if two hadrons of identical type undergo an inelastic collision along the beam axis with the same speed, the corresponding rapidity will be 
,
When several particles are produced in the same collision, difference in rapidity  between any two particles  and  will be invariant under any such boost along the beam axis. And if both particles are massless, this will also hold for pseudorapidity.

References

 V. Chiochia (2010) Accelerators and Particle Detectors from University of Zurich

Experimental particle physics